Monica L. Edmondson (born in Gällivare) is a Sami woman known for glass art. She attended Australian National University. One of her works is called 100 Migratory.

References

External links 
Monica Edmondson site

Australian National University alumni
People from Gällivare Municipality
Glass artists
Women glass artists
Swedish Sámi people
Sámi artists